Jean-Guy Donat Morissette (December 16, 1937 – March 22, 2011) was a Canadian  professional ice hockey goaltender who played in one National Hockey League game for the Montreal Canadiens during the 1963–64 NHL season.
He had a wife, Claude, as well as two children.

See also
List of players who played only one game in the NHL

References

External links

1937 births
2011 deaths
Baltimore Clippers players
Canadian ice hockey goaltenders
Chicoutimi Saguenéens (QMJHL) players
Cleveland Barons (1937–1973) players
Ice hockey people from Quebec
Montreal Canadiens players
Omaha Knights (CHL) players
Quebec Aces (AHL) players
Vancouver Canucks (WHL) players
Victoria Maple Leafs players